Joel Edgerton (born 23 June 1974) is an Australian actor and filmmaker. He is best known  for his appearance in the Star Wars films Attack of the Clones (2002) and Revenge of the Sith (2005) as a young Owen Lars, a role he reprised in the Disney+ series Obi-Wan Kenobi (2022). Edgerton also appeared in King Arthur (2004) as Gawain, Warrior (2011), Zero Dark Thirty (2012), The Great Gatsby (2013), Black Mass (2015), Loving (2016), Bright (2017), Red Sparrow (2018), The King (2019), The Stranger (2022), and the limited series The Underground Railroad (2021).

In Australia, Edgerton portrayed Will McGill in the drama series The Secret Life of Us (2001–02), for which he won the AACTA Award for Best Lead Actor in a Television Drama. He has appeared in several Australian films, such as The Square (2008), Animal Kingdom (2010), for which he won the AACTA Award for Best Actor in a Supporting Role, Wish You Were Here (2012), and Felony (2013).

In 2015, Edgerton received a nomination for the Directors Guild of America Award for Outstanding Directing – First-Time Feature Film for The Gift, a psychological horror-thriller film he wrote, directed, co-produced, and in which he co-starred. Edgerton garnered further critical acclaim for his performance as Richard Loving in the 2016 historical drama Loving, for which he received a nomination for the Golden Globe Award for Best Actor. In 2018, he wrote, directed, and starred in the drama Boy Erased, about gay conversion therapy. The following year's The King, which he co-wrote and starred in, was released on Netflix.

Early life
Edgerton was born in Blacktown, New South Wales, Australia the son of Michael, a solicitor and property developer, and Marianne (née van Dort) Edgerton. His mother is a Dutch immigrant, who was born in The Hague. He graduated from The Hills Grammar School in 1991. He attended the Nepean Drama School at the University of Western Sydney, before moving on to various stage productions, including at Sydney Theatre Company.

Career

Edgerton has appeared in such films as Erskineville Kings, King Arthur and Ned Kelly. In the Star Wars franchise, he played a young Owen Lars in Attack of the Clones (2002) and Revenge of the Sith (2005) and reprised the role in the Disney+ series Obi-Wan Kenobi. He played Will on The Secret Life of Us, for which he won an AACTA Award in 2002. In 2005, he lent his voice to the title character of The Mysterious Geographic Explorations of Jasper Morello, an Academy Award-nominated animated short film. The same year, he appeared as the son of a deceased shoemaker in the British comedy Kinky Boots. He appeared in Smokin' Aces (2006).

Edgerton appeared in the film Whisper (2007), The Square (which he co-wrote and was directed by his brother Nash Edgerton), Acolytes, and Separation City. In 2009, he starred alongside as Stanley in the Sydney Theatre Company's acclaimed production of A Streetcar Named Desire. He appeared in a production of the same play at the Brooklyn Academy of Music in December 2009. He appeared in the crime drama film Animal Kingdom as Barry Baz Brown in 2010 in which he won an AFI award. He starred as fictional MMA fighter Brendan Conlon in the film Warrior (2011).

In February 2010, Edgerton was cast in Matthijs van Heijningen Jr.'s 2011 prequel to The Thing, portraying helicopter pilot Sam Carter. He played Tom Buchanan in Baz Luhrmann's 2013 remake of The Great Gatsby. He was honoured for his work in international roles with the 2011 Australians in Film Breakthrough Award.

In 2013, it was revealed that Edgerton and David Michôd had collaborated on writing an adaptation of Shakespeare's "Henriad" plays, Henry IV, Part 1, Henry IV, Part 2 and Henry V, for Warner Bros. Pictures.

In 2014, Edgerton starred in the biblical film Exodus: Gods and Kings, as Ramesses II, Moses' adoptive brother, who became a notorious king. Edgerton directed, starred in, wrote, and produced the thriller The Gift, which was released on 7 August 2015. He co-starred in the 2015 film Black Mass as John Connolly, FBI contact and childhood friend of notorious gangster Whitey Bulger.

In 2016, he starred in the Jeff Nichols films Midnight Special and Loving, and in 2017, he starred in the film Bright as Officer Nick Jacoby, an orc who is a police officer. He will reprise the character in the sequel along with Will Smith, directed by Louis Leterrier for Netflix.

In 2018, Edgerton headlined Francis Lawrence's thriller film Red Sparrow with Jennifer Lawrence, and based on the book by Jason Matthews. He plays Nathaniel Nash, a CIA agent who becomes involved with a Russian spy Dominika Egorova (Lawrence). In February 2018, Timothée Chalamet joined the cast of The King, with Brad Pitt, Dede Gardner, and Jeremy Kleiner producing, alongside Liz Watts, under their Plan B Entertainment banner. In March 2018, Edgerton joined the cast of the film.

In April 2020, during the COVID-19 pandemic in Australia, it was announced that a new film, The Unknown Man, will begin filming in South Australia as soon as enough of the COVID-19 restrictions are lifted. Directed by Thomas M. Wright, it will also star Sean Harris. In September 2020, Edgerton was set to star in an ensemble film The Brutalist directed by Brady Corbet. In the same month, he was tapped to star in and executive produce limited series The Florida Man based on a novel of the same name by Tom Cooper.

In 2021, Edgerton starred in the medieval fantasy film The Green Knight written and directed by David Lowery.

Philanthropy
Edgerton has been a distinguished ambassador for The Fred Hollows Foundation for a number of years and has strong personal ties to the organisation, which works to restore people's sight in poor countries and to improve the health of Aboriginal Australians. In 2012, he visited Nepal, where he saw sight restored first hand. He has described social activism and his involvement with The Fred Hollows Foundation as "an escape" from the "materialistic life" that often surrounds an actor. The Fred Hollows Foundation is an international non-profit organization which educates and provides equipment for undersupported surgeons to help cure avoidable blindness.

Personal life
Edgerton's brother, Nash, is a stuntman and filmmaker. Both he and his brother are a part of the Australian film collective Blue-Tongue Films. Nash directed Joel in 2018's Gringo.

In 2018, Edgerton began a relationship with Christine Centenera, fashion director of Vogue Australia. They have known each other since the late 1990s. Their twins were born in May 2021.

Filmography

Acting roles

Film

Television

Filmmaking credits

Stage

Awards and nominations

References

External links

 
 

 
1974 births
Australian film producers
Australian screenwriters
Australian male film actors
Australian male television actors
Australian male voice actors
Australian people of Dutch descent
Horror film directors
Living people
Male actors from Sydney
20th-century Australian male actors
21st-century Australian male actors
People educated at The Hills Grammar School
Best Supporting Actor AACTA Award winners
Western Sydney University alumni
Australian film directors